Deepali Deshpande (born 3 August 1969 in Mumbai) is an Indian sport shooter. She won a silver medal in rifle shooting at the 2004 Asian Shooting Championships in Kuala Lumpur, Malaysia, and was selected to compete for India at the 2004 Summer Olympics, finishing nineteenth in the rifle three positions. Deshpande also served throughout her sporting career as a member of the Indian Shooting Federation under her coaches Laszlo Szucsak and Sunny Thomas.

Deshpande qualified for the Indian squad, along with her compatriot Anjali Bhagwat, in the women's 50 m rifle 3 positions at the 2004 Summer Olympics in Athens, by shooting a minimum qualifying score of 571 to obtain a seventh-place finish and assure an Olympic slot from the Asian Championships in Kuala Lumpur, Malaysia. She fired 194 in the prone position and 189 each in both standing and kneeling to aggregate a total record of 572 points, ending her up in nineteenth place from a field of thirty-two prospective shooters.

References

External links
 
 

1969 births
Living people
Indian female sport shooters
Asian Games medalists in shooting
Asian Games silver medalists for India
Shooters at the 2002 Asian Games
Medalists at the 2002 Asian Games
Shooters at the 2004 Summer Olympics
Sport shooters from Mumbai
Sportswomen from Maharashtra
20th-century Indian women
20th-century Indian people
Recipients of the Arjuna Award